The 2016 season was Kelantan's 8th season in the Malaysia Super League since being promoted and 21st successive season in the top flight of Malaysian football league system. They were also eligible to compete in Malaysia FA Cup starting from the second round and Malaysia Cup after placed in 6th place at the end of 2016 Malaysia Super League first leg.

Sponsors
Supplier: DSV / Sponsors : Vida Beauty, Chengal Jati, Sinar Harian, Azham Zamiri, Konsortium Mutiara, Puspamara, Delima Perdana, UniKL, redONE, HORC

Pre-season
The pre-season matches were held between 30 December 2015 to 6 February 2016. During those matches several foreign players made their trials with the team. They were Yakubu Aziz, André Luís Leite, Prince Nnake, Marko Perović, Fabiyi, Valci Teixeira Júnior and Dramane Traoré.

During season 
Match were held during mid-season break and matches were held between 25 March and 4 July 2016. Several foreign players made a trial with the team for second window transfer.

Competitions

Overall

Malaysia Super League

League table

Results by round

Matches

The 2016 season began on 13 February and concluded on 22 October 2016.

FA Cup

Malaysia Cup

The 2016 Malaysia Cup draw was made on 23 May 2016 in Kuala Lumpur. Kelantan were to face Selangor, Kuala Lumpur and Pahang. Scoring a total of 10 points, Kelantan advanced to the knockout stage as group runner-up.

Group stage

Knockout phase

Quarter-finals

 * PDRM won on away goals rule

Squad information

List of players

PC is a Presiden Cup player who have played for the senior team as a starter, substitute or benched

Playing statistics

Key:
 = Appearances,
 = Goals,
 = Yellow card,
 = Red card
Player names in bold denotes player that left mid-season (loaned)(number in bracket denotes the players plays as a substitute in a match)

Statistics accurate as of 23 September 2016.

Goalscorers
Includes all competitive matches. The list is sorted alphabetically by surname when total goals are equal.

Correct as of match played on 22 October 2016

Hat-tricks

Correct as of match played on 16 August 2016

Note
4 Player scored 4 goals5 Player scored 5 goals

Top assists

Correct as of match played on 23 September 2016

Player name in bold denote the player who have left the club

Clean sheets 
Includes all competitive matches. The list is sorted alphabetically by surname when total clean sheets are equal.

Correct as of 22 October 2016

Suspensions

Summary
All matches played included

Home Attendance

source:Sistem Pengurusan Maklumat Bolasepak

Transfers and loans

Transfers in

Transfers out

Loans Out

References

2016
Malaysian football clubs 2016 season
Kelantan FA